Within the North Atlantic Ocean, a Category 2 hurricane is a tropical cyclone, that has 1-minute sustained wind speeds of between . Since records began in 1851, a total of 245 tropical cyclones have peaked at this intensity.

Background

Since HURDAT began in 1851, Atlantic hurricanes have been tracked. In 1971, the Saffir–Simpson scale was devised by two meteorologists. Category 2 was designed as the fourth-highest category on the scale.

Systems

1850s

|-
| Five ||  ||  ||  || The Caribbean, Mexico, Southeastern United States ||  ||  ||
|-
| Eight ||  ||  ||  || Florida, Georgia ||  ||  ||
|-
| Four ||  ||  ||  || Texas ||  ||  ||
|-
| One ||  ||  ||  || Mexico ||  ||  ||
|-
| Two ||  ||  ||  || None ||  ||  ||
|-
| Two ||  ||  ||  || United States East Coast ||  ||  ||
|-
| Four ||  ||  ||  || The Caribbean, Mexico, Texas ||  ||  ||
|-
| Three ||  ||  ||  || Florida, Northeastern United States ||  ||  ||
|-
| Six ||  ||  ||  || Bahamas, Bermuda ||  ||  ||
|-
| One ||  ||  ||  || Mexico ||  ||  ||
|-
| Two ||  ||  ||  || None ||  ||  ||
|}

1860s

|-
| Two ||  ||  ||  || None ||  ||  ||
|-
| Four ||  ||  ||  || United States Gulf Coast ||  ||  ||
|-
| Six ||  ||  ||  || Louisiana, Mississippi ||  ||  ||
|-
| Seven ||  ||  ||  || None ||  ||  ||
|-
| One ||  ||  ||  || Lesser Antilies ||  ||  ||
|-
| Three ||  ||  ||  || None ||  ||  ||
|-
| Two ||  ||  ||  || None ||  ||  ||
|-
| Three ||  ||  ||  || None ||  ||  ||
|-
| One ||  ||  ||  || None ||  ||  ||
|-
| Two ||  ||  ||  || None ||  ||  ||
|-
| Three ||  ||  ||  || United States East Coast, Nova Scotia ||  ||  ||
|-
| Four ||  ||  ||  || North Carolina ||  ||  ||
|-
| Four ||  ||  ||  || The Caribbean, United States Gulf Coast ||  ||  ||
|-
| Seven ||  ||  ||  || The Caribbean, Florida ||  ||  ||
|-
| One ||  ||  ||   || Louisiana, Texas ||  ||  ||
|-
| Two ||  ||  ||  || Mexico ||  ||  ||
|-
| Four ||  ||  ||  || Newfoundland ||  ||  ||
|-
| Two ||  ||  ||   || United States East Coast ||  ||  ||
|-
| Three ||  ||  ||  || The Caribbean ||  ||  ||
|-
| Six ||  ||  ||  || None ||  ||  ||
|-
| Seven ||  ||  ||  || Mexico, Texas, South Eastern United States ||  ||  ||
|-
| One ||  ||  ||  || None ||  ||  ||
|-
| Three ||  ||  ||  || None ||  ||  ||
|-
| Four ||  ||  ||  || None ||  ||  ||
|-
| One ||  ||  ||  || None ||  ||  ||
|-
| Two ||  ||  ||  || Texas ||  ||  ||
|-
| Seven ||  ||  ||  || None ||  ||  ||
|-
| Ten ||  ||  ||  || Northeastern United States, New Brunswick ||  ||  ||
|}

1870s

|-
| Two ||  ||  ||  || Nova Scotia ||  ||  ||
|-
| Nine ||  ||  ||  || Cuba, South Eastern United States ||  ||  ||
|-
| Ten ||  ||  ||  || Hispanlola ||  ||  ||
|-
| Five ||  ||  ||  || Atlantic Canada ||  ||  ||
|-
| Two ||  ||  ||  || Atlantic Canada ||  ||  ||
|-
| Seven ||  ||  ||  || Greater Antilles, Bahamas ||  ||  ||
|-
| Five ||  ||  ||  || None ||  ||  ||
|-
| Four ||  ||  ||  || None ||  ||  ||
|-
| Four ||  ||  ||  || The Bahamas ||  ||  ||
|-
| Five ||  ||  ||  || The Caribbean, Eastern United States || Significant ||  ||
|-
| Six ||  ||  ||  || None ||  ||  ||
|-
| Eleven||October 18 – 21, 1878 ||  ||   || Cuba, Bahamas, United States East Coast ||  ||  ||
|-
| Two||August 19 – 24, 1879 ||  ||   || Yucatán Peninsula, Texas, Louisiana ||  ||Unknown ||
|-
| Eight ||  ||  ||  || Canada ||  ||  ||
|}

1880s

|-
| Four||August 24 – September 1, 1880 ||  ||   ||Florida, Mississippi||68||Unknown ||
|-
| Five||August 21 – 29, 1881 ||  ||   ||Georgia, Mississippi||700||Severe ||
|-
| Six||September 7 – 11, 1881 ||  ||   ||United States East Coast||0||Unknown ||
|-
| Four||October 7 – 17, 1884 ||  ||   ||Jamaica, Cuba, Bahamas, Turks and Caicos Islands||8||Unknown ||
|-
| Two||August 21 – 27, 1885 ||  ||   ||Bahamas, Florida, Georgia, South Carolina, North Carolina, Maryland||25||$1.8 million ||
|-
| One||June 13 – 15, 1886 ||  ||  ||Texas, Louisiana||Unknown||Unknown ||
|-
| Two||June 17 – 24, 1886 ||  || Unknown||Florida, Southeastern United States, Mid-Atlantic states||0||Severe ||
|-
| Three||June 27 – July 4, 1886 ||  ||  ||Florida, North Carolina, Maryland||18||Unknown ||
|-
| Eight||September 16 – 24, 1886 ||  ||  ||Cuba, Texas ||0||Unknown ||
|-
| Nine||September 22 – 30, 1886 ||  ||  || None ||  ||  ||
|-
| Four||July 20 – 28, 1887 ||  ||  ||Cuba, Yucatán Peninsula, Florida, Georgia, Alabama||0||Extensive ||
|-
| Eight ||  ||  ||   || United Kingdom ||  ||  ||
|-
| Nine||September 11 – 22, 1887 ||  ||  || Yucatán Peninsula, Texas, Extreme Northeastern Mexico||14||Unknown ||
|-
| Fifteen|| October 15 – 19, 1887 ||  ||   || None ||  ||  ||
|-
| Seven||October 8 – 12, 1888 ||  ||  || United States East Coast ||0||Unknown ||
|-
| Nine||November 17 – 25, 1888 ||  ||  || None ||  ||  ||
|-
| Four||September 1 – 12, 1889 ||  ||   ||Puerto Rico, Virginia||40||Minimal ||
|-
| Six||September 12 – 25, 1889 ||  ||  ||Yucatán Peninsula, Florida ||0||Minor ||
|}

1890s

|-
| Four||September 2 – 8, 1891 ||  ||Unknown||New England, Nova Scotia, Newfoundland||0||Minor ||
|-
| Five||September 16 – 26, 1891 ||  ||  ||Bermuda||0||Minimal ||
|-
| Six||September 29 – October 5, 1891 ||  ||  ||Nova Scotia, Newfoundland ||0||None ||
|-
| Three||September 3 – 17, 1892 ||  ||Unknown||None||0||None ||
|-
| Five||September 12 – 23, 1892 ||  ||Unknown||Azores||0||Minor ||
|-
| Seven||October 5 – 16, 1892 ||  ||Unknown||Trinidad and Tobago, Venezuela, Colombia, Nicaragua, Honduras, Mexico||0||Unknown ||
|-
| Two||July 4 – 7, 1893 ||  ||Unknown||Nicaragua, Belize, Yucatán Peninsula, Tabasco||Many||Unknown ||
|-
| Five||August 15 – 19, 1893 ||  ||Unknown||Sable Island, Newfoundland||0||Minor ||
|-
| Seven||August 20 – 29, 1893 ||  ||Unknown||Azores||5||Unknown ||
|-
| Eight||September 4 – 9, 1893 ||  ||  || Yucatán Peninsula, Louisiana, Alabama||0||Unknown ||
|-
| Seven||October 21 – 29, 1894 || ||  ||None||0||None ||
|-
| Two||August 22 – 30, 1895 ||  ||  ||Yucatán Peninsula, Texas ||0||Minimal ||
|-
| Five||October 12 – 26, 1895 ||  ||   ||Cuba, Bahamas||Unknown||Unknown ||
|-
| One||July 4–9, 1896 ||  ||Unknown||Cuba (questioned), United States East Coast, Canada, Greenland||1||$100 thousand ||
|-
| Three||September 18 – 28, 1896 ||  ||Unknown||Cuba, North Carolina||0||Minimal ||
|-
| Five||October 7 – 13, 1896 ||  ||Unknown||Florida, North Carolina, Virginia, New England||4||$500 thousand ||
|-
| Six||October 26 – November 9, 1896 ||  ||Unknown||None||0||None ||
|-
| One||August 31 – September 9, 1897 ||  ||  ||None||45 || None ||
|-
| Four||September 5 – 19, 1898 ||  ||  ||Lesser Antilles, Windward Islands||383||$2.5 million ||
|-
| Two||July 28 – August 2, 1899 ||  ||  ||Dominican Republic, Bahamas, Florida, Alabama||7||>$1 million ||
|-
| Four||August 29 – September 5, 1899 ||  || Unknown||Lesser Antilles, Puerto Rico, Haiti, Bermuda||0||Unknown ||
|-
| Nine||October 26 – 31, 1899 ||  ||  ||Cuba, Bahamas, Jamaica, North Carolina||1+||$200 thousand ||.
|}

1900s

|-
| Three ||  ||  ||  || None ||  ||  ||
|-
| Seven||August 29 – September 10, 1901 ||  ||   || Cape Verde ||  ||  ||
|-
| Three ||  ||  ||  || None ||  ||  ||
|-
| Four ||  ||  ||  || Mexico, Southeastern United States ||  ||  ||
|-
| Four ||  ||  ||  || United States East Coast ||  ||  ||
|-
| Six ||  ||  ||  || Bermuda || Severe ||  ||
|-
| Seven ||  ||  ||  || None ||  ||  ||
|-
| Two||June 14 – 23, 1906 ||  ||   ||Cuba, Florida||0||Minor ||
|-
| One||March 6 – 9, 1908 ||  ||  ||Saint Barthélemy, Saint Martin, Saint Kitts||0||Moderate ||
|-
| Eight||  ||  ||  || The Caribbean, The Bahamas ||  ||  ||
|-
| Nine ||  ||  ||  || Nicaragua ||  ||  ||
|-
| Two ||  ||  ||  || Texas, Mexico ||  ||  ||
|-
| Twelve ||  ||  || Unknown || Greater Antilles ||  ||  ||
|}

1910s

|-
| Three ||  ||  ||  || Puerto Rico, Texas, Louisiana || Unknown || Unknown ||
|-
| Four ||  ||  ||  || None ||  ||  ||
|-
| Three ||  ||  ||  || Georgia, South Carolina ||  ||  ||
|-
| Four ||  ||  ||  || Colombia, Nicaragua ||  ||  ||
|-
| Six ||  ||  ||  || Yucatán Peninsula, Texas ||  ||  ||
|-
| Four ||  ||  ||  || Cuba, Eastern United States || >$100,000 || 25 ||
|-
| Three ||  ||  ||  || Massachusetts, Nova Scotia || Unknown || Unknown ||
|-
| Seven ||  ||  ||  || Greater Antiles, Florida ||  ||  ||
|-
| Fourteen ||  ||  ||  ||Yucatán Peninsula, Florida, Alabama || $100,000 ||  ||
|-
| Two ||  ||  ||  || Honduras, Belize || Minor ||  ||
|-
| Five ||  ||  ||  || Bermuda || Minor ||  ||
|-
| Three ||  ||  ||  || None ||  ||  ||
|-
| One ||  ||  ||  || None ||  ||  ||
|-
| Two ||  ||  ||  || Central America, Louisiana, Arkansas ||  ||  ||
|}

1920s

|-
| Four||October 11 – 22, 1922 ||  ||  ||Colombia, Yucatán Peninsula, Tabasco||0||Unknown ||
|-
| Two||September 1 – 9, 1923 ||  ||   ||None||0||None ||
|-
| Four||August 26 – September 3, 1924 ||  ||  ||Guadeloupe, Montserrat, Anguilla, Saint Thomas, Leeward Islands||89||Heavy ||
|-
| Five||September 10 – 14, 1926 ||  ||   ||None||0||None ||
|-
| Eight||September 21 – October 1, 1926 ||  ||   ||Azores ||0||Minor ||
|-
| Four||September 23 – 28, 1927 ||  ||  ||None||0||None ||
|-
| One||August 3 – 10, 1928 ||  ||   ||Bahamas, Florida, Georgia, South Carolina||2||$235 thousand ||
|}

1930s

|-
| Seven||September 8 – 16, 1931 ||  ||  ||Puerto Rico, Dominican Republic, Haiti, Jamaica, Belize, Yucatán Peninsula, Veracruz||2||Moderate ||
|-
| Fifteen||November 3 – 10, 1932 ||  ||  ||Azores||0||Unknown ||
|-
| Two||June 24 – July 8, 1933 ||  ||  ||Trinidad, Venezuela, Jamaica, Cayman Islands, Cuba, Tamaulipas||35||$7.5 million ||
|-
| Thirteen||September 10 – 15, 1933 ||  ||  ||Guatemala, Belize, Quintana Roo, Yucatán Peninsula, Tampico||67||Millions ||
|-
| One||June 4 – 18, 1934 ||  ||  ||Belize, Guatemala, Chiapas, Yucatán Peninsula, Louisiana, Mississippi, Tennessee||>1,000||$4.4 million ||.
|-
| Seven||September 3 – 7, 1934 ||  ||   ||United States East Coast||8||$10 thousand ||
|-
| Ten||October 1 – 4, 1934 ||  ||  ||None||0||None ||
|-
| Seven||October 30 – November 8, 1935 ||  ||   ||The Bahamas, Florida||19||$5.5 million ||
|-
| Five||July 27 – August 1, 1936 ||  ||   ||Bahamas, Florida, Alabama||4||$200 thousand ||
|-
| Ten||August 25 – September 5, 1936 ||  ||  ||None||0||None ||
|-
| Fifteen||September 18 – 25, 1936 ||  ||   ||Nova Scotia||0||None ||
|-
| Four||September 9 – 14, 1937 ||  ||  ||Nova Scotia, Canada||0||$1.5 million ||
|-
| Eight||September 20 – 26, 1937 ||  ||  ||None||0||None ||
|}

1940s

|-
| Two||August 3 – 10, 1940 ||  ||  ||Texas, Louisiana, Arkansas||7||$10.75 million ||
|-
| Three||August 5 – 14, 1940 ||  ||  ||South Carolina, Mid-Atlantic states||52||$13 million ||
|-
| Four||August 26 – September 2, 1940 ||  ||  ||North Carolina, New England, Nova Scotia, Quebec||7||$4.05 million ||
|-
| Five||September 7 – 17, 1940 ||  ||  ||Nova Scotia, Newfoundland||3||$1.49 million ||
|-
| Seven||September 22 – 28, 1940 ||  ||  ||Azores||0||None ||
|-
| Four||August 25 – September 3, 1942 ||  || Unknown||None||0||None ||
|-
| Eleven||November 5 – 11, 1942 ||  ||  ||Cuba, Belize, Mexico||9||$9 million ||
|-
| One||July 25 – 30, 1943 ||  ||  ||Texas, Louisiana||19||$17 million ||
|-
| Six||September 15 – 20, 1943 ||  ||Unknown||United States Gulf Coast||0||$419 thousand ||
|-
| Nine||October 11 – 17, 1943 ||  || Unknown||Leeward Islands, Puerto Rico, Bermuda||0||$300 thousand ||
|-
| Nine||September 21 – 26, 1944 ||  ||Unknown||None||0||None ||
|-
| One||June 20 – 27, 1945 ||  ||  ||United States East Coast||1||$750 thousand ||
|-
| Eleven||October 10 – 13, 1945 ||  ||  ||Greater Antilles, Bahamas||5||$2 million ||
|-
| Four||September 12 – 15, 1946 ||  ||  ||Bahamas, Nova Scotia, Newfoundland||0||None ||
|-
| Six||October 5 – 9, 1946 ||  ||  ||Cuba, Florida, Georgia, South Carolina||5||$5.2 million ||
|-
| Charlie||August 9 – 16, 1947 ||  ||  ||Quintana Roo, Tamaulipas||48||Unknown ||
|-
| King||October 8 – 16, 1947 ||  ||   ||Honduras, Florida, Alabama||1||$3.26 million ||
|-
| One||August 21 – 25, 1949 ||  ||  ||North Carolina||2||$50 thousand ||
|-
| Eleven||September 27 – October 6, 1949 ||  ||  ||Guatemala, Campeche, Texas ||2||$6.7 million ||
|}

1950s

|-
| Baker||August 18 – September 1, 1950 ||  ||   ||Leeward Islands, Puerto Rico, Hispaniola, Cuba, United States Gulf Coast||38||$2.5 million ||
|-
| Charlie||August 21 – September 5, 1950 ||  ||  ||None||0||None ||
|-
| George||September 27 – October 5, 1950 ||  ||  ||Iceland||0||None ||
|-
| Item||October 8 – 11, 1950 ||  ||   ||Yucatán Peninsula, Western Mexico||0||$1.5 million ||
|-
| How||September 29 – October 5, 1951 ||  ||  ||Florida, Iceland||17||$2 million ||
|-
| Able||August 18 – September 3, 1952 ||  ||  ||South Carolina, North Carolina, Virginia, Maryland||3||$21.7 million ||
|-
| Baker||August 31 – September 8, 1952 ||  ||  ||None||0||None ||
|-
| Easy||October 6 – 11, 1952 ||  ||   ||None||0||None ||
|-
| Alice||June 24 – 27, 1954 ||  ||  ||Mexico||56||$2 million ||
|-
| Thirteen||September 25 – October 6, 1954 ||  ||  ||None||0||None ||
|-
| Diane||August 7 – 20, 1955 ||  ||   ||North Carolina, Pennsylvania, New York, New Jersey, New England||184||$754.7 million ||
|-
| Edith||August 21 – 31, 1955 ||  ||   ||None||0||None ||
|-
| Flora||September 2 – 9, 1955 ||  ||   ||None||0||None ||
|-
| Katie||October 14 – 19, 1955 ||  ||  ||Central America, Dominican Republic, Hispaniola, Puerto Rico, Cuba, Bahamas, Dominica||7||$200 thousand ||
|-
| Greta||October 31 – November 6, 1956 ||  ||  ||Cuba, Bahamas, Florida, Guadeloupe||1||$3.58 million ||
|-
| Ella||August 30 – September 6, 1958 ||  ||  ||Haiti, Dominican Republic, Cuba, Louisiana, Texas ||37||>$100 thousand ||
|-
| Ilsa||September 24 – 30, 1958 ||  ||  ||Bermuda||0||None ||
|-
| Janice||October 4 – 11, 1958 ||  ||  ||Jamaica, Cuba, Bahamas||9||$200 thousand ||
|}

1960s

|-
| Anna||July 20 – 24, 1961 ||  ||   ||Windward Islands, Colombia, Venezuela, Central America, Jamaica||1||$300 thousand ||
|-
| Daisy||September 29 – October 7, 1962 ||  ||   ||Leeward Islands, Bermuda, New England, Atlantic Canada||32||$1.1 million ||
|-
| Ella||October 14 – 22, 1962 ||  ||  ||Cuba, United States East Coast, Atlantic Canada||2||Unknown ||
|-
| Edith||September 23 – 29, 1963 ||  ||  ||Lesser Antilles, Puerto Rico, Hispaniola, Turks and Caicos Islands, Bahamas||10||$46.6 million ||
|-
| Ginny||October 17 – 29, 1963 ||  ||  ||Hispaniola, Turks and Caicos Islands, The Bahamas, United States East Coast, Nova Scotia, Newfoundland||5||$500 thousand ||
|-
| Ethel||September 4 – 14, 1964 ||  ||   ||Bermuda||0||Minimal ||
|-
| Anna||August 21 – 25, 1965 ||  ||   ||None||0||None ||
|-
| Elena||October 12 – 19, 1965 ||  ||  ||None||0||None ||
|-
| Chloe||September 5 – 21, 1967 ||  ||  ||Cape Verde, Spain, France||14||Unknown ||
|-
| Kara||October 7 – 18, 1969 ||  ||   ||North Carolina||0||None ||
|-
| Laurie||October 17 – 27, 1969 ||  ||   ||Mexico||0||Minor ||
|}

1970s

|-
| Eighteen||October 12 – 17, 1970 ||  ||   ||Bermuda, Nova Scotia, Newfoundland||0||Unknown ||
|-
| Ginger||September 6 – October 3, 1971 ||  ||  ||Bahamas, North Carolina||1||$10 million ||
|-
| Betty||August 22 – September 1, 1972 ||  ||   ||None||0||None ||
|-
| Fifi||September 14 – 22, 1974 ||  ||  ||Hispaniola, Jamaica, Mexico, Central America||8,210||$1.8 billion ||
|-
| Doris||August 28 – September 4, 1975 ||  ||  ||None||0||None ||
|-
| Faye||September 18 – 29, 1975 ||  ||   ||Bermuda||0||Minimal ||
|-
| Emmy||August 20 – September 4, 1976 ||  ||   ||Lesser Antilles, Azores||68||Minimal ||
|-
| Gloria||September 26 – October 4, 1976 ||  ||   ||None||0||None ||
|-
| Flossie||September 4 – 15, 1978 ||  ||  ||None||0||None ||
|-
| Gloria||September 4 – 15, 1979 ||  ||  ||None||0||None ||
|}

1980s

|-
| Bonnie||August 14 – 19, 1980 ||  ||  ||None||0||None ||
|-
| Ivan||October 4 – 11, 1980 ||  ||   ||None||0||None ||
|-
| Jeanne||November 8 – 16, 1980 ||  ||  ||Florida, Gulf of Mexico, United States Gulf Coast||0||Minimal ||
|-
| Gert||September 7 – 15, 1981 ||  ||   ||Puerto Rico||0||None ||
|-
| Josephine||October 7 – 18, 1984 ||  ||   ||United States East Coast||1||Minor ||
|-
| Earl||September 10 – 18, 1986 ||  ||   ||None||0||None ||
|-
| Dean||July 31 – August 9, 1989 ||  ||   ||Leeward Islands, Bermuda, North Carolina, Newfoundland||0||$8.9 million ||
|-
| Erin||August 18 – 27, 1989 ||  ||   ||Cape Verde||0||None ||
|}

1990s

|-
| Diana ||  ||  ||  || Central America || Extensive ||  ||
|-
| Isidore ||  ||  ||  || None ||  ||  ||
|-
| Grace ||  ||  ||   || None ||  ||  ||
|-
| Bonnie ||  ||  ||  || Azores || Minimal ||  ||
|-
| Charley ||  ||  ||  || Azores ||  ||  ||
|-
| Gert ||  ||  ||  || Central America ||  ||  ||
|-
| Florence ||  ||  ||  || None ||  ||  ||
|-
| Erin ||  ||  ||  || Florida, Mid-Atlantic States, New England ||  ||  ||
|-
| Humberto||August 21 – September 1, 1995 ||  ||  || None ||  ||  ||
|-
| Iris||August 22 – September 4, 1995 ||  ||  ||Antigua, Montserrat, Barbuda||5||Unknown ||
|-
| Danielle ||  ||  ||   ||Puerto Rico, United States East Coast, Atlantic Canada, United Kingdom ||  ||  ||
|-
| Earl ||  ||  ||  || Mexico, Florida ||  ||  ||
|-
| Jeanne ||  ||  ||   || None ||  ||  ||
|-
| Karl ||  ||  ||   || None ||  ||  ||
|-
| Dennis ||  ||  ||   || The Bahamas, United States East Coast, Atlantic Canada ||  ||  ||
|-
| Irene ||  ||  ||  || Cuba, Southeastern United States ||  ||  ||
|-
| Jose ||  ||  ||  || Lesser Antilles, Puerto Rico ||  ||  ||
|}

2000s

|-
| Michael ||  ||  ||  || Bermuda, United States East Coast, Atlantic Canada ||  ||  ||
|-
| Humberto ||  ||  ||   || None ||  ||  ||
|-
| Gustav ||  ||  ||  || North Carolina, Virginia, New Jersey ||  ||  ||
|-
| Juan ||  ||  ||  || Canada ||  ||  ||
|-
| Danielle ||  ||  ||  || Cape Verde ||  ||  ||
|-
| Irene ||  ||  ||   || United States East Coast ||  ||  ||
|-
| Dolly ||  ||  ||  || Guatemala, Mexico, South Central United States ||  ||  ||
|-
| Ida ||  ||  ||   || Nicaragua, Yucatán Peninsula, Cuba, Southeastern United States ||  ||  ||
|}

2010s

|-
| Alex ||  ||  ||  || Greater Antilles, Belize, Mexico, Texas ||  ||  ||
|-
| Paula ||  ||  ||   || Nicaragua, Honduras, MexicoCuba, Bahamas, Florida ||  ||  ||
|-
| Richard ||  ||  ||  || Honduras, Belize, Guatemala, Mexico ||  ||  ||
|-
| Tomas ||  ||  ||  || Windward Islands, Leeward AntillesGreater Antilles, Lucayan Archipelago ||  ||  ||
|-
| Ernesto ||  ||  ||  || Windward Islands, Jamaica, Central America, Mexico ||  ||  ||
|-
| Gordon ||  ||  ||  || Azores ||  ||  ||
|-
| Kirk ||  ||  ||   || None ||  ||  ||
|-
| Arthur ||  ||  ||  || Bahamas, North Carolina, Nova Scotia ||  ||  ||
|-
| Gert ||  ||  ||  || Bermuda, United States East Coast, Atlantic Canada ||  ||  ||
|-
| Katia ||  ||  ||   || Mexico ||  ||  ||
|-
| Chris ||  ||  ||  || Bermuda, Iceland ||  ||  ||
|-
| Helene ||  ||  ||  || West Africa, Cape Verde, Azores ||  ||  ||
|-
| Oscar ||  ||  ||  || Faroe Islands ||  ||  ||
|-
| Jerry ||  ||  ||   || None ||  ||  ||
|}

2020s

|-
| Paulette ||  ||  ||   || Bermuda ||  ||  ||
|-
| Sally ||  ||  ||   || The Bahamas, Cuba, United States Gulf Coast ||  ||  ||
|-
| Earl ||  ||  ||  || Puerto Rico, Bermuda ||  ||  || 
|-
|}

Other systems
The 1842 Spain hurricane on October 26, reached a possible, but HURDAT-unverified, Category 2 intensity.

In May 1863, Hurricane "Amanda" wreaked havoc in the Southeast United States. Its intensity was equivalent to Category 2.

Michael Chenoweth
A climate researcher: Michael Chenoweth has suggested that the following systems were Category 2 hurricanes on the Saffir-Simpson hurricane wind scale: 

|-
| Unnamed ||  || ||  || None ||  ||  ||
|-
| Unnamed ||  || ||  || The Bahamas ||  ||  ||
|-
| Unnamed ||  ||  ||  || Texas, Mexico ||  ||  ||
|-
| Eight ||  ||  ||  || Mexico, Florida ||  ||  ||
|-
| Unnamed ||  ||  ||  || The Caribbean ||  ||  ||
|}

Climatology

See also

 List of Category 2 Pacific hurricanes

Notes

References

External links
United States National Hurricane Center

Category 2 tropical cyclones
Atlantic 2
Category 2